Philip Champion de Crespigny (1738–1803) was a British lawyer and politician who sat in the House of Commons between 1774 and 1790.
 
He was of Huguenot descent, the son of Philip Champion de Crespigny (1704-1765), proctor of the Admiralty court, and his wife Anne Fonnereau, daughter of Claude Fonnereau of Christchurch Mansion in Ipswich, Suffolk. His elder brother Claude was made a baronet in 1805.

Philip Champion de Crespigny was probably educated at Eton College in 1748, and was an advocate of Doctors' Commons in 1759. In 1768, he became King's Proctor and held the post until 1784.

In 1774, he was elected as a Member of Parliament for Sudbury on the Fonnereau interest after a contest, but lost his seat on petition. In 1780, he was returned unopposed at Aldeburgh, also on the Fonnereau interest, as well as at Sudbury after a contest. He held both seats until 1781, when he lost Sudbury on petition, and continued to sit for Aldeburgh. The English Chronicle wrote in 1781 that “his hauteur is so distinguished, that he is generally characterised ... by the profane, though very applicable appellation, of God Almighty”. He was returned unopposed at Aldeburgh in 1784, but did not stand in the 1790 election.  He was a member of the Whig club.

Champion de Crespigny was married four times: first, to Sarah, daughter of Thomas Cocksedge of Thetford, Norfolk, on 24 November 1762; second, in about 1771 to Betsy Hodges, who died 1772; third to Clarissa, daughter of James Brooke, on 1 July 1774 (she died on 15 May 1782); and fourth, to Dorothy, daughter of Richard Scott of Betton, Shropshire, on 20 February 1783. His daughter Eliza married Hussey Vivian, 1st Baron Vivian.

He died on 1 January 1803. His obituary in The Gentleman's Magazine described him as “very much a man of fashion in his person and demeanour, full of anecdote, and with a turn for satirical humour that rendered him a very amusing companion”.

References

1730s births
1803 deaths
British MPs 1774–1780
British MPs 1780–1784
British MPs 1784–1790
Members of the Parliament of Great Britain for English constituencies